Alice Inoue (born July 17, 1964) is an astrologer, feng shui expert, author, and life coach from Hawaii. She is a former television presenter, most notably for her Do Sports program on Fuji News where she showcased activities for Japanese tourists visiting Hawaii. At the height of her media career, she had three television shows and four major sponsors. She has been featured in numerous publications including gracing the cover of MidWeek twice and appearing in Hawaii Business Magazine, Pacific Business News, The Honolulu Advertiser, Honolulu Star-Bulletin, MidWeek, Homescapes, and Hawaii Home & Remodeling. Inoue is the founder and currently a life guide at Happiness U, a school for adults in Honolulu that provides advice and inspiration about life and happiness. She also has a weekly column in the Hawaii Renovation called Go Ask Alice where she answers readers' questions relating to life and feng shui.

Early life and education
Inoue was born in San Francisco, California, to a Taiwanese mother and German-Irish father. From the age of eight, she was raised bilingually in Taiwan, speaking both English and Mandarin. Graduating from Morrison Academy in 1981, Inoue returned to the United States to continue her education. She attended the University of California at Santa Cruz where she studied for four years, earning a degree in Biology as a pre-med student. Instead of pursuing medical school, Inoue moved to Japan to teach English while at the same time learned to speak Japanese.

Career
While in Japan, Inoue responded to a job advertisement seeking a bilingual assistant. She applied and was hired by Pacific Network Services, relocating to Hawaii in 1989. Inoue met and eventually married Egan Inoue, a former racquetball champion turned mixed martial arts practitioner. She transitioned into media where she worked as a live daily television show host, moving on to work as a bilingual news anchor and then host of her own Japanese television show. Inoue began her television career in commercials, including one with First Hawaiian Bank alongside Pat Morita. Her career also includes anchoring for Oahu Island News on the KVCN-TV for the Visitor Cable Network. The program is broadcast in over 28,000 hotel rooms throughout Hawaii. She also spent time as a co-host on KFVE's live game show, Times Super Bingo. Inoue also anchored for Aloha Times News on Japan TV News-NHK where she featured various segments on Hawaii tourism. She also had a featured sports program on Fuji News, Japan's top rated news network. The program, Do Sports, was taped in Japanese and tailored towards Japanese tourists. In the program, Inoue was featured trying new activities such as skydiving, high performance kite flying, wind sailing, and deep sea fishing. The show was so popular among Japanese tourists that she would often get stopped while in public in order to sign autographs and pose for pictures.   

Inoue began a career change in the late 1990s. After being told by an astrologer that she would be changing career paths, two years later, her television contracts reached their end and she was unemployed. Inoue was quoted as saying "that moment I knew that this is what I've come here to do." She began focusing on astrology and taking courses on feng shui. Inoue became a minister in 2001, marrying close to 900 couples since being ordained. She also began study of feng shui and astrology. In 2008 she joined forces with Oceanic Time Warner Cable to produce a series of feng shui instructional DVDs based on her signature presentations. Inoue performs work as a life guide under her consultancy Alice Inoue Life Guidance. In 2013 she expanded her consultancy to include Happiness U, a school for adults in Honolulu that provides advice and inspiration about life and happiness. It was reported that she has provided guidance for 3,000 people with 500 of them being regular clients.

Inoue is also a writer and has authored eight books. She is a contributing author in the national best seller, Wake Up…Live the Life You Love with Passion, a compilation of self-development philosophies by great thinkers such as Deepak Chopra and Wayne Dyer. She published her own book, A Loving Guide to These Shifting Times, in 2008 with a second book, Be Happy!  It's Your Choice released in 2009. Additional books include Feng Shui Your Life! (2009). Inoue has also released three instructional DVDs that cover feng shui topics. In 2019, Inoue released Master Your Superpowers, a book utilizing the Chinese Five Elements to identify personality traits that can improve someone's wellness and mindful living.

Awards and recognition
Inoue has been nominated and/or won numerous awards for her writings. She was a finalist for the 2011 Indie Excellence Book Awards in the Mind, Body, Spirit category for her book Be Happy! It's Your Choice. Feng Shui Your Life! was a winner in the 2011 Indie Excellence Book Awards in the Mind, Body, Spirit category and Home and Office Interior Design. Just Ask Alice! was a finalist in the 2012 Indie Excellence Book Awards in the Mind, Body, Spirit category as well as a silver medalist in the Living Now Book Awards.

Inoue received two additional awards for her writing in 2013; the Evergreen Medal for Personal Growth for her book A Loving Guide to These Shifting Times. and an Indie Excellence Award in the well-being category for her book Destination Happiness.

Bibliography

References

External links 
 Alice Inoue official website
 Alice Inoue Life Guidance, LLC

1964 births
Living people
21st-century American writers
21st-century American women writers
21st-century astrologers
American television actresses
American people of German descent
American people of Irish descent
American actresses of Taiwanese descent
University of California, Santa Cruz alumni
Writers from Hawaii
Writers from San Francisco